Philippa Hall was a British television presenter on Sky News. She then worked as a presenter for Sky News Active until 2015 when she departed Sky News.

Hall was brought up on her family farm in Leicestershire.  She took a degree in International Theatre from Royal Holloway and a postgraduate diploma in Broadcast Journalism from the University of Westminster.p

Hall worked for the BBC on local radio before joining Sky News in 2007.  She was a newscaster for 5 News at Lunchtime on Channel 5 from September 2009 until February 2012.

References

Living people
Sky News newsreaders and journalists
5 News presenters and reporters
Year of birth missing (living people)